Cheshmeh Mazar (also Romanized as Cheshmeh Mazār; also known as Cheshmeh Marār) is a village in Nashtifan Rural District, in the Central District of Khaf County, Razavi Khorasan Province, Iran. At the 2006 census, its population was 150, in 34 families.

References 

Populated places in Khaf County